Anouar Abdel-Malek (Arabic: أنور عبد الملك), (23 October 1924 – 15 June 2012) was an Egyptian-French political scientist of Coptic descent. He was a pan-Arabist and Marxist.

Anouar Abdel-Malek gained a bachelor's degree in philosophy in 1954 from Ain Shams University before studying for a doctorate at the Sorbonne. He subsequently joined the CNRS, becoming head of research there in 1970.

Works
 Égypte : société militaire, 1962. Translated by Charles Lam Markmann as Egypt: military society; the army regime, the left, and social change under Nasser, 1968.
 Anthologie de la littérature arabe contemporaine, 1964
 Idéologie et renaissance nationale, l'Égypte moderne, 1969
 La Pensée politique arabe contemporaine, 1970. Translated by Michael Pallis as Contemporary Arab political thought, 1983
 (ed.) Sociologie de l'impérialisme, 1971
 La dialectique sociale, 1972. Translated by Mike Gonzalez as Social dialectics, 2 vols., 1980.
 Nation and revolution, 1981
 (ed. with Miroslav Pečujlićand Gregory Blue) Science and technology in the transformation of the world, 1982
 (ed. with Ānisujjāmāna) Culture and thought in the transformation of the world, 1983.

References

1924 births
2012 deaths
Academics from Cairo
Ain Shams University alumni
Egyptian Arab nationalists
Egyptian Marxists
Egyptian people of Coptic descent
French male writers
French people of Coptic descent
French political scientists
University of Paris alumni
Egyptian emigrants to France